Emigration from the United States is the process where citizens from the United States move to live in other countries, creating an American diaspora (overseas Americans). The process is the reverse of the immigration to the United States. The United States does not keep track of emigration, and counts of Americans abroad are thus only available based on statistics kept by the destination countries.

History 
Due to the flow of people back and forth between the United Kingdom and its colonies, as well as between the colonies, there has been an American diaspora of a sort since before the United States was founded. During the American Revolutionary War, a number of American Loyalists relocated to other countries, chiefly Canada and the United Kingdom. Residence in countries outside the British Empire was unusual, and usually limited to the well-to-do, such as Benjamin Franklin, who was able to self-finance his trip to Paris as a U.S. diplomat.

18th century
After the American Revolutionary War, some 3,000 Black Loyalists - men who escaped enslavement by Patriot masters and served on the Loyalist side because of the Crown's guarantee of freedom - were evacuated from New York to Nova Scotia; they were individually listed in the Book of Negroes as the British gave them certificates of freedom and arranged for their transportation. The Crown gave them land grants and supplies to help them resettle in Nova Scotia. Other Black Loyalists were evacuated to London or the Caribbean colonies.

Thousands of enslaved people escaped from plantations and fled to British lines, especially after British occupation of Charleston, South Carolina. When the British evacuated, they took many former enslaved people with them. Many ended up among London's Black Poor, with 400 resettled by the Sierra Leone Company to Freetown in Africa in 1787.  Five years later, another 1,192 Black Loyalists from Nova Scotia chose to emigrate to Sierra Leone, becoming known as the Nova Scotian settlers  in the new British colony of Sierra Leone. Both waves of settlers became part of the Sierra Leone Creole people and the founders of the nation of Sierra Leone.

19th century 
Thanks to the increase of whalers and clipper ships, Americans began to travel all over the world for business reasons.

The early 19th century also saw the beginning of overseas religious missionary activity, such as with Adoniram Judson in Burma.

During the War of 1812, some African American slaves joined the Corps of Colonial Marines to fight against the United States. Their reward was guaranteed emancipation (as per the Mutiny Act of 1807) and new land set aside for them in southern Trinidad. They and their descendants later became known as the Merikins.

The middle of the 19th century saw the immigration of many New Englanders to Hawaii, as missionaries for the Congregational Church, and as traders and whalers. The American population eventually overthrew the government of Hawaii, leading to its annexation by the United States.

During this time the American Colonization Society established a colony in the Pepper Coast for freedmen known as Liberia. The ACS's main goals were to Christianize indigenous Africans, end the illegal slave trade, and resettle African Americans out of the United States. Their descendants became the Americo-Liberians, who dominated the country for most of its history.

During the early 19th century, particularly between 1824-1826, thousands of free blacks emigrated from the United States to Haiti to escape antebellum segregation and racist policy. They primarily settled in Samana Province, where their descendants still live today as the Samana Americans.  They speak their own variety of English called Samana English.

During the American Civil War, President Lincoln asked Kansas Senator Samuel C. Pomeroy and Secretary of the Interior Caleb Blood Smith to develop a plan to resettle African Americans out of the United States. Pomeroy had come up with the idea of Linconia, a freedmen colony much like Liberia in modern Chiriqui Province, Panama. After nearby Central American nations expressed their opposition to the project, it was quickly scrapped. However, 453 African workers were sent to Ile-à-Vache in Haiti as part of a private colonization effort run by entrepreneur Bernard Kock. Unfortunately, this colony was short-lived due to Kock breaking the contract. By the end of 1863, all of the colonists had returned to the United States.

After the Civil War, thousands of Southerners moved to Brazil, where slavery was still legal at the time. They founded a city called Americana and became known as Confederados. Some also migrated to Mexico, where they established the New Virginia Colony with the help of Emperor Maximilian I of Mexico. They founded their capital, Carlota, and had planned to make more settlements, but the colony was abandoned after the fall of the Second Mexican Empire, and most of the settlers returned to the U.S. There was also a sizeable presence of ex-confederates in British Honduras, now known as Belize.

In Asia, the U.S. government made efforts to secure special privileges for its citizens. This began with the Treaty of Wanghia in China in 1844.  It was followed by the expedition of Commodore Perry to Japan 10 years later, and the United States–Korea Treaty of 1882. American traders began to settle in those countries.

Early 20th century 
Many Americans migrated to the Philippines after it became a U.S. territory following the Philippine–American War.

Cecil Rhodes created the Rhodes Scholarship in 1902 to encourage greater cooperation between the United States, the British Empire and Germany by allowing students to study abroad.

Interwar period 
In the period between the First and Second World Wars, many Americans, particularly writers such as Ernest Hemingway, Gertrude Stein, and Ezra Pound, migrated to Europe to take part in the cultural scene.

European cities like Amsterdam, Berlin, Copenhagen, Paris, Prague, Rome, Stockholm, and Vienna came to host a large number of Americans.  Many Americans, typically those who were idealistic and/or involved in left-leaning politics, also participated in the Spanish Civil War (mainly supporting the Republicans against the Nationalists) in Spain while they lived in Madrid and elsewhere.

Other Americans returned home to the countries of their origin, including the parents of American author/illustrator Eric Carle, who returned to Germany. Thousands of Japanese Americans were unable to return to the United States, after the Attack on Pearl Harbor.

Éamon de Valera, the third taoscieach of Ireland during the 1930s, was born in New York to an Irish mother and a Spanish father. He moved to Ireland at a young age with his mother's family.

Cold War 
During the Cold War, Americans became a permanent fixture in many countries with large populations of American soldiers, such as West Germany and South Korea.

The Cold War also saw the development of government programs to encourage young Americans to go abroad.  The Fulbright Program was established in 1946 to encourage cultural exchange, and the Peace Corps was created in 1961 both to encourage cultural exchange and a civic spirit of volunteerism.

With the formation of the state of Israel, over 100,000 Jews made aliyah to the holy land, where they played a role in the creation of the state. Other Americans traveled to countries like Lebanon, again to take place in the cultural scene.

During the Vietnam War, about 100,000 American men went abroad to avoid conscription, 90% of them going to Canada. European nations, including neutral states like Denmark, Norway, Sweden, and Switzerland, offered asylum to thousands of American expatriates who refused to fight.

A small number of Americans abandoned the country for political reasons, defecting to the Soviet Union, Cuba, or other countries, such as Miguel d'Escoto Brockmann, and sixties radicals such as Joanne Chesimard, Pete O'Neal, Eldridge Cleaver, and Stokely Carmichael.

During this period Americans continued to travel abroad for religious reasons, such as Richard James, inventor of the Slinky, who went to Bolivia with the Wycliffe Bible Translators, and the Peoples Temple establishment of Jonestown in Guyana.

After the Cold War 
The opening of Eastern Europe, Central Europe, and Central Asia after the Cold War provided new opportunities for American businesspeople. Additionally, with the global dominance of the United States in the world economy, the ESL industry continued to grow, especially in new and emerging markets. Many Americans also take a year abroad during college, and some return to the country after graduation.

21st century 

Iraq War deserters sought refuge mostly in Canada and Europe, and NSA whistleblower Edward Snowden escaped to Russia.

Increasing numbers of Americans retire abroad due to financial setbacks resulting from the 2008 financial crisis.

Young Americans facing a tough job market due to the recession are also increasingly open to working abroad.

According to a Gallup poll from January 2019, 16% of Americans, including 40% of women under the age of 30, would like to leave the United States. In 2018, the Federal Voting Assistance Program estimated a total number of 4.8 million American civilians lived abroad,  3.9 million civilians, plus 1.2 million service members and other government-affiliated Americans.

Reasons for emigrating
There are many reasons why Americans emigrate from the United States. Economic reasons include job or business opportunities, or a higher standard of living in another country. Others emigrate due to marriage or partnership to a foreigner, for religious or humanitarian purposes, or to seek adventure or experience a different culture. Many decide to retire abroad seeking a lower cost of living, especially more affordable health care. Immigrants to the United States may decide to return to their countries of origin to be with family members. Other reasons include political dissatisfaction, safety concerns and cultural issues such as racism. Some Americans may also emigrate to evade legal liabilities; a common past case was evasion of mandatory military service.

In addition to Americans who choose to emigrate as adults, many children are born in the United States to foreign temporary workers or international students and naturally move with their parents when they return to their countries of origin. Due to their acquisition of U.S. citizenship by birth but no significant connection to the country, they are sometimes called "accidental Americans".

Destinations with facilitated access
In addition to U.S. territories, U.S. citizens have the right to reside in the Marshall Islands, Micronesia and Palau due to a Compact of Free Association between the United States and each of these countries. They may also freely move to Svalbard due to its open migration policy, as long as they are able to obtain housing and means of support there.

Americans with parents or ancestors from certain countries, such as Germany, Ireland and Italy, may be able to claim nationality via jus sanguinis and therefore move there freely. Germany and Austria also have an easier path to citizenship for descendants of victims of Nazi crimes, even if ius sanguinis does not apply in the specific case. Similarly, American Jews may move to Israel under its Law of Return.

The USMCA (and previously NAFTA) allows U.S. citizens to work in Canada and Mexico in business or in certain professions, with few restrictions. However, to obtain permanent residence they must still satisfy the regular immigration requirements in these countries.

Net effect
The United States is a net immigration country, meaning more people arrive in the U.S. than leave it. There is a scarcity of official records in this domain. Given the high dynamics of the emigration-prone groups, emigration from the United States remains indiscernible from temporary country leave.

Citizenship

Anyone born in the United States, with the sole exception of those born to foreign diplomats, acquires U.S. citizenship at birth. Those born abroad to at least one American parent also acquire U.S. citizenship if the parent had lived in the United States for a certain number of years. Immigrants to the United States may also become U.S. citizens by naturalization.

In the past it was possible for Americans abroad to lose U.S. citizenship involuntarily, but after Supreme Court decisions such as Afroyim v. Rusk and Vance v. Terrazas, along with corresponding changes in U.S. law, they can only lose U.S. citizenship in a very limited number of ways, most commonly by expressly renouncing it at a U.S. embassy or consulate.

Historically, few Americans renounced U.S. citizenship per year, but the numbers drastically increased after 2010 when the U.S. government enacted the Foreign Account Tax Compliance Act, requiring foreign banks to report information on American holders of bank accounts located outside the United States. More than 3,000 Americans renounced U.S. citizenship in 2013, many citing the financial disclosure requirements and difficulty in finding banks willing to accept them as customers. More than 5,000 renounced in 2016, and more than 6,000 did in 2020.

Issues
One of the biggest issues with the American diaspora is double taxation. Unlike almost all countries in the world, the United States taxes its citizens even if they do not live in the country. The foreign earned income exclusion mitigates double taxation on income from work, but the Internal Revenue Code treats ordinary foreign savings plans held by residents of foreign countries as if they were offshore tax avoidance instruments and requires extensive asset reporting, resulting in significant costs for Americans at all income levels to comply with filing requirements even when they owe no tax. Even Canada's Registered Disability Savings Plan falls under such reporting requirements. The most prominent piece of legislation which has attracted the ire of Americans abroad is the Foreign Account Tax Compliance Act (FATCA). Disadvantages stemming from FATCA, such as hindering career advancement overseas, may decrease the number of Americans in the diaspora in future years. The problem is so severe that some Americans have addressed it by renouncing or relinquishing their U.S. citizenship. Since 2013, the number of people giving up US citizenship has risen to a new record each year, with an unprecedented 5,411 in 2016, up 26% from the 4,279 renunciations in 2015.

Statistics
There are no exact figures on how many Americans live abroad. The United States Census Bureau does not count Americans abroad, and individual U.S. embassies offer only rough estimates.

In 1999, a Department of State estimate suggested that the number of Americans abroad may be between 3 million and 6 million. In 2016, the agency estimated 9 million U.S. citizens were living abroad, but these numbers are highly open to dispute as they often are unverified and can change rapidly.

According to the Federal Voting Assistance Program (FVAP), the Department of State's estimates are inflated on purpose as their purpose is to prepare for emergencies. FVAP makes its own detailed estimates of the number of U.S. citizens abroad, by region and by country, and of those who are of voting age, based on a variety of sources such as censuses of other countries and U.S. tax and social security records. In 2018, it estimated about 4.8 million U.S. citizens abroad, of whom about 2.9 million were of voting age. FVAP's estimates also fluctuate significantly, for example it had estimated about 5.5 million in 2016.

The United Nations estimates the number of migrants by origin and destination of all countries and territories. In 2019, the organization estimated that about 3.2 million people from the United States were living elsewhere. This number is mostly based on country of birth recorded in censuses, so it does not include U.S. citizens who were not born in the United States, such as those who acquired U.S. citizenship by descent or naturalization.

One indicator of the U.S. citizen population overseas is the number of Consular Reports of Birth Abroad requested by U.S. citizens from a U.S. embassy or consulate as a proof of U.S. citizenship of their children born abroad. The Bureau of Consular Affairs reported issuing 503,585 such documents over the decade 2000–2009. Based on this, and on some assumptions about the family composition and birth rates, some authors estimate the U.S. civilian population overseas as between 3.6 and 4.3 million.

Sizes of certain subsets of U.S. citizens living abroad can be estimated based on statistics published by the Internal Revenue Service (IRS). U.S. citizens with income above a certain level are required to file a U.S. income tax regardless of where they reside. During 2019, the IRS recorded about 739,000 U.S. tax returns filed with a foreign address, representing about 1.3 million people including spouses and dependents. Other indicators are the number of U.S. tax returns with a partial exclusion on income from work abroad (about 476,000 in 2016) and those reporting foreign income other than passive income (about 1.5 million in 2016), but not all of these were from people actually residing abroad full-time.

Estimates by country

The list below is of the main countries hosting American populations. Those shown first with exact counts are enumerations of Americans who have immigrated to those countries and are legally resident there, does not include those who were born there to one or two American parents, does not necessarily include those born in the U.S. to parents temporarily in the U.S. and moved with parents by right of citizenship rather than immigration, and does not necessarily include temporary expatriates. In all other cases, starting with Israel, the figures are estimates of part-time U.S. resident Americans and expatriates alike.
 – 899,311 United States-born residents of Mexico (2017)
 – 800,000 (2013; all EU countries combined)
 – 738,203 (2011)
 – 700,000 according to a press release from the White House on 12/06/2017
 – 600,000 (2015)
 –  400,000 (2020)  
 – 260,000
 Israel – 185,000
 – 54,000
 – 158,000 (2013)
 – 140,222 (2016)
 – 109,450 (2021)
 – 100,619 (2008)
 – 88,000 (2011)
 – 15,000
 – 71,493 (2010, Mainland China only)
 – 48,225
 – 60,000 
 – 60,000
 – 52,486
 – 47,408 (2021)
 – 40,000 
 – 38,000
 – 36,000
 – 36,000 
 – 32,000 
 – 31,000 to 60,000 
 – 25,000
 – 25,000
 – 17,748 (2006)
 – 16,555 (2009)
 – 15,000
 – 15,000
 – 15,000
 – 14,000
 – 13,000
 – 12,475 (2006)
 – 11,000
 – 10,552 
 — 10,409 (2017)
 – 10,000
 – 9,634 (2018)
 – 9,510 (2019; 7,131 have residence permit for 12+ months)
 – 9,128 to 50,000
 – 8,013 (2012)
 – 8,000
 – 7,500
 – 7,000
 – 7,000
 – 6,000
 – 6,000
 – 6,000
 – 6,000
 Finland – 5,576 
 – 5,417 (2010)
 – 5,000
 – 5,000
 – 5,000
 – 20,000
 – 4,000
 – 4,000
 – 4,000
 – 4,000
 – 3,000
 – 3,000
 – 3,000
 – 3,000
 – 2,228 (2008)
 – at least 2,008 up to 6,200
 – at least 2,000
 – 2,000
 – 3,000
 – 3,000
 – 2,000
 – 2,000
 – 2,000

See also
 Immigration to the United States
 Americans in India
 American Canadians
 American Mexicans
 Americans in Cuba
 American Brazilians
 Americans in the United Kingdom
 American Australians
 American New Zealanders
 Americans in France
 Americans in the Philippines
 Americans in Japan
 Americo-Liberian people
 Sierra Leone Creole people
 Americans living in Saudi Arabia
 American settlement in the Philippines
 Lost Generation
 Mexicans of American descent
 Confederados of Brazil
 Taxation of non resident Americans
 American Citizens Abroad
 Taxation of United States persons
 International taxation
 Relinquishment of United States nationality
 Samaná English
 List of Americans who married international nobility
 Americans in Haiti
 Americans in Costa Rica
 Americans in Germany
 Americans in the United Arab Emirates
 Americans in Uruguay
 Americans in Ireland
 Americans in Qatar
 Americans in Taiwan
 Americans in China
 Americans in Guatemala

References

External links 
 The American Diaspora, Esquire, 26 September 2008.
 Jones, Chris.  The New American. Esquire, 23 September 2008.
 Sappho, Paul. A Looming American Diaspora, Harvard Business Review, 2009.
 Sullivan, Andrew. The New American Diaspora The Atlantic, 29 September 2009.
 Go East Young Moneyman, The Economist, 14 April 2011.
 William Curtis Donovan. The Coming American Diaspora, 1 October 2008.

 
History of the United States
 
Cultural history of the United States